John Bryson (born 1943) is an American businessman and 37th United States Secretary of Commerce.

John Bryson may also refer to:

John Bryson (mayor) (fl. c. 1889), American politician, 19th mayor of Los Angeles, California
John Bryson (author) (1935–2022), Australian author and former lawyer
John Bryson (Canadian politician) (1849–1896), Canadian lumberman, farmer, and politician from Quebec
John Bryson (RAF officer) (1913?–1940), Canadian fighter pilot

See also
John Bryson Chane (born 1944), bishop of Washington